Alfonso, officially the Municipality of Alfonso,  is a 1st class municipality in the province of Cavite, Philippines. According to the 2020 census, it has a population of 59,306 people.

History
Alfonso was totally forested until the 17th century when a few pocket settlements sprouted. The town was originally part of Barrio Lumampong in the town of Indang. In the course of time, the pocket settlements grew into sitios and later on into barrios. The town became a separate district municipality from Indang on 16 March 1859 through the efforts of the community leaders Bonifacio Aveo and Felix del Mundo. The new town was called Alas-as for a period of seventeen years. The name refers to the name of a tree used for the construction of houses and bears sweet fruit. It was, eventually, named after King Alfonso XII of Spain, son of Isabella II. Alfonso was initially composed of the barrios of Taywanak, Pajo, Esperanza, Marahan, Matagbak, Sinaliw and Kaytitinga. Don Narciso Mojica was the capitan municipal of Alfonso at the outbreak of the Philippine Revolution. A few days after the Cry of Balintawak, on 31 August 1896, General Mariano Trias ordered the liquidation of all Spaniards in the municipality. In the bloody battle that followed, the leaders of the revolutionists were General Hipolito Rint, Captain Eriberto Cetro (Kapitan Berto) and Predencio Rolle (Tandang Doro).

Geography
Alfonso is an upland town situated at the south-western portion of the Cavite province. It is 74 kilometers from Manila via Tagaytay. Magallanes bounds it on the west, Batangas province on the south, Mendez and Tagaytay on the east, General Aguinaldo on the north-west and Maragondon and Indang on the north-east.

Barangays
Alfonso is politically subdivided into 32 barangays.

Climate

Demographics

Economy

Government

The following are the duly elected officials of Alfonso, Cavite for the term 2022–2025.

References

External links

Profile: Alfonso, Cavite - Official Website of the Province of Cavite
Profile: Alfonso, Cavite - DILG Calabarzon Region
[ Philippine Standard Geographic Code]
Philippine Census Information

Municipalities of Cavite